Parva is a 2002 Indian Kannada-language musical drama film directed and written by Sunil Kumar Desai and produced by H. C. Srinivas. The film stars Vishnuvardhan along with Prema, Roja and Yakshagana exponent 'Keremane' Shambhu Hegde in prominent roles. The music was written, scored and produced by Hamsalekha.

The film released on 18 January 2002 to generally positive reviews from critics.

Plot 
This is one of the rare movies in Kannada cinema history. The movie starts with a song and also ends with a song and dance. This is probably the first time in Kannada cinema where the director uses a song to complete the climax for the movie.

Sagar (Vishnuvardhan) is a good singer and dancer. He starts searching for Suma (Prema) in a huge crowd. When the crowd starts wondering why is he looking for her commences the first flashback, which is one among the seven or so flashbacks in the movie.

Sagar is a nice guy who has taken up drinking due to failure in his love life. Suma lands at Sagar's place to learn bharathanatyam from his father, who is an expert. She tries to find out why Sagar has stopped singing. This leads to another flashback where Sagar explains as to how he was ditched by Sudha (Roja) and also narrates how he lost his mother. This forced him to stop singing and take up drinking. Sagar finally takes up singing after much persuasion from Suma and returns to the singing family. He also agrees to give a comeback show, but insists on Suma's presence in that show. Suma never turns up for the show. Here begins the search for her. He sets a deadline through a TV performance to Suma.

Suma turns up to Sagar's place and this leads to another flashback where she narrates as to why she couldn't attend the performance a year back. Bhattacharya is a very good singer. He and Suma's father (Dattatreya) have an argument because Bhattacharya's father insisted on his daughter winning the competition and forces him to go for a particular raga. This irritates Suma's father and he leaves the huge hall in a rage. He meets with an accident and dies. Bhattacharya insists on Suma not attending Sagar's performance as that will harm the growth of his daughter's image and that's the reason Suma doesn't turn up to Sagar's show (all this was a flashback). The rest of the movie is about the clash between Sagar and Bhattacharya. This leads to the climax song which is of 11–13 minutes duration and how he defeats Bhattacharya in a competition.

Cast

Soundtrack
The music of the film was composed and the lyrics written by Hamsalekha. It was earlier rumored that singer Lata Mangeshkar would sing a song in the film. However, it turned out to be a mere gossip.

Awards

 Karnataka State Film Award for Best Supporting Actor -  Keremane Shambhu Hegde

References

External source

 movie review

2002 films
2000s Kannada-language films
2000s musical drama films
Indian musical drama films
Films scored by Hamsalekha
Films directed by Sunil Kumar Desai
2002 drama films